Gladstone Hotel may refer to:

in Australia
A small hotel in Dulwich Hill, New South Wales

in Canada
The Gladstone Hotel in Toronto, a small but historic hotel and noted performance venue

in New Zealand
An historic hotel in Christchurch demolished in 2005

in the United Kingdom
The Liner Hotel, in Liverpool, formerly named the Gladstone

in the United States
Gladstone Hotel (Arkansas City, Kansas), formerly listed on the National Register of Historic Places in Cowley County, Kansas
Gladstone Hotel (Circle, Montana), listed on the National Register of Historic Places in McCone County, Montana